Kislukha is a rural locality (a settlement) in Povalikhinsky Selsoviet, Pervomaysky District, Altai Krai, Russia. The population was 263 as of 2013. There are 17 streets.

Geography 
Kislukha is located 29 km northwest of Novoaltaysk (the district's administrative centre) by road. Povalikha is the nearest rural locality.

References 

Rural localities in Pervomaysky District, Altai Krai